Jorge Molina may refer to:

 Jorge Molina (footballer, born 1982), Spanish footballer
 Jorge Molina (footballer, born 1988), Peruvian footballer
 Jorge Molina Enríquez (born 1966), Cuban film director
 Jorge Molina (comics) (born 1984), Mexican comic artist
 Jorge Molina (rower) (born 1956), Argentine Olympic rower
 Jorge Molina (sport shooter) (born 1956), Colombian sports shooter
 Jorge Alberto Molina (born 1956), Salvadoran military officer and Minister of National Defense of El Salvador